Sznak is a village in the Kapan Municipality of the Syunik Province in Armenia.

References 

Populated places in Syunik Province